The list of those invited to join the Academy of Motion Picture Arts and Sciences as members in 2006.

Actors
Amy Adams
Eric Bana
Maria Bello
Dakota Fanning
Jake Gyllenhaal
Terrence Howard
Felicity Huffman
Keira Knightley
Heath Ledger
Hayley Mills
Barry Pepper
Joaquin Phoenix
Jon Polito
Ving Rhames
Liev Schreiber
David Strathairn
Rachel Weisz
Wally Pfister

Animators
Wayne Allwine
Mark Andrews
Steve Box
John Canemaker
Will Finn
Rex Grignon
Andrew Jimenez
Tim Johnson
Hayao Miyazaki

Directors
Werner Herzog
Nicole Holofcener
Gavin Hood
Bennett Miller
Mark Waters

Documentary
Paola di Florio
Alex Gibney
Hubert Sauper

Executives
Gail Berman
Jeff Bewkes
Colin Callender
Andrew E. Cripps
Hal Gaba
Elizabeth Gabler
Douglas Mankoff
Michael Paseornek
Paul Schaeffer
Jonathan Sehring
Michael J. Werner

Film editors
Tom Finan
Wayne Wahrman
Hughes Winborne

Public relations
Andre Caraco
Mary Murphy Conlin
Steve Elzer
Barbara Glazer
Rick Lynch
Steven T. Miller

At-Large
Grover Crisp
Louis D'Esposito
Daniel Glickman
Steve Papazian
David Young

Casting directors
Sarah Halley Finn
Randi Hiller

Cinematographers
Lance Acord
Paul Cameron
Cesar Charlone
Denis Lenoir
Roberto Schaefer
Sandi Sissel
Tom Stern
Salvatore Totino

Costume designers
Jacqueline Durran
Janty Yates

Live Action Short Films
Pia Clemente
Martin McDonagh
Rob Pearlstein

Makeup/Hairstylists
Lance Anderson
Nick Dudman

Music
Harry Gregson-Williams
Alberto Iglesias
Dario Marianelli
Dolly Parton

Producers
Albert Berger
Bill Kong
Tom Luddy
Gail Mutrux
Diane Nabatoff
Cathy Schulman
Jennifer Todd
Robert K. Weiss
Ron Yerxa

Production designers/Art directors
Mark Friedberg
Sarah Greenwood
Tom Reta
Melissa Stewart
Tom Wilkins

Visual effects
Jim Berney
Pablo Helman
Jeffrey M. Kleiser
Michael Meinardus
William F. “Bill' Shourt
Dan Taylor
Bill Tondreau
Bill Westenhofer

Writers
Noah Baumbach
Jeffrey Caine
Jean-Claude Carrière
Dan Futterman
Tony Kushner
Bobby Moresco
Josh Olson

References

2006
Invitees,2006